Blučina is a municipality and village in Brno-Country District in the South Moravian Region of the Czech Republic. It has about 2,300 inhabitants.

History
The first written mention of Blučina is from 1240.

Archaeology
Blučina is known for the Blučina burial, an important Migration period (5th century) burial. It was discovered in 1953 on Cezany hill, above the confluence of the Cezava and Svratka rivers.

References

Villages in Brno-Country District
Archaeological sites in the Czech Republic